Fordia pauciflora is a species of legume in the family Fabaceae. It is a tree found in Peninsular Malaysia and Thailand. It is threatened by habitat loss.

Taxonomy
The specific epithet pauciflora is Latin for 'few-flowered'.

References

Millettieae
Trees of Peninsular Malaysia
Trees of Thailand
Vulnerable plants
Taxonomy articles created by Polbot